Frank Milton Tyler  (July 25, 1876 - February 22, 1961) was an American architect.

Early life

Tyler was born on July 25, 1876, in Kansas.

Career

Tyler designed the S.H. Watson House in Victoria Park, Los Angeles in 1908. The same year, he also designed a seven-room bugalow for F.Z. Phillips, a two-story, eight-room wood-frame house for E.L. Petitfils, and the H.C. Jensen Store and Apartements, all of which were located in Los Angeles. In 1910–1911, he designed a house for Francis E. Bacon in Berkeley Square in West Adams, Los Angeles. In 1911–1912, he designed a house for Nathan W. Tarr in Sierra Madre, California. The same two years, he designed the German Presbyterian Church located at 1009 E 41st Place in Los Angeles, now demolished. He also designed the Minney House/Salisbury House located at 2273 West 20th Street in West Adams, Los Angeles. He also designed a house in Eagle Rock, Los Angeles. In 1927, he designed an Art Deco commercial building located at 5464 Wilshire Boulevard in Los Angeles.

He also designed homes in Harvard Heights, Los Angeles and Pico-Union, Los Angeles. Some of them are on the List of Los Angeles Historic-Cultural Monuments in South Los Angeles, such as the Gordon L. McDonough House at 2532 5th Avenue, the Chalet Apartments at 2375 Scarff Street, and the Julius Bierlich Residence at 1818 S. Gramercy Place. Additionally, some of his houses in the South Serrano Avenue Historic District are listed on the National Register of Historic Places.

Personal life and death
Tyler lived in Harvard Heights, Los Angeles. With his wife Lillian B Burkhard, he had two sons, Donald Burkhart Tyler and Walter Harry Tyler.

Tyler died in San Luis Obispo, California at the age of 85.

References

Architects from Los Angeles
1876 births
1961 deaths